Li Fubao  is a Chinese football player who played for China in the 1980 Asian Cup.

Career statistics

International statistics

References

External links
Team China Stats

Chinese footballers
China international footballers
1980 AFC Asian Cup players
1954 births
Living people
Asian Games bronze medalists for China
Asian Games medalists in football
Association football forwards
Association football midfielders
Footballers at the 1978 Asian Games
Medalists at the 1978 Asian Games
Jiangsu F.C. players
People from Hebei